Crkvine is a village in the municipality of Tutin, Serbia. According to the 2002 census, the village has a population of 136 people. The population descends from 17th-century migrants from the territory of Montenegro.

References

Populated places in Raška District